Christiaan Tonnet (23 February 1902 – 14 November 1946) was a Dutch equestrian and modern pentathlete. He competed in the pentathlon at the 1924 and 1928 Summer Olympics and in the equestrian events at the 1936 Summer Olympics.

References

External links
 

1902 births
1946 deaths
Dutch male equestrians
Dutch male modern pentathletes
Olympic equestrians of the Netherlands
Olympic modern pentathletes of the Netherlands
Modern pentathletes at the 1924 Summer Olympics
Modern pentathletes at the 1928 Summer Olympics
Equestrians at the 1936 Summer Olympics
Sportspeople from The Hague